"Love Will Show Us How" is a song by Christine McVie, released as the second single from her eponymous second solo album in 1984. The song reached #30 on the Billboard Hot 100 and #32 on the Billboard Adult Contemporary chart.

Reception
Cash Box said that the song "is a thoroughly upbeat tune with a stiff tempo and smooth backup harmonies" and that "the one-of-a-kind McVie vocal is like smoke and satin."

Personnel 
 Christine McVie – keyboards, lead vocals
 Todd Sharp – guitars, backing vocals
 George Hawkins – bass, backing vocals
 Steve Ferrone – drums, tambourine

References

External links
Listen to this song on YouTube

Songs written by Christine McVie
1984 songs
1984 singles
Warner Records singles
Christine_McVie songs